Kinnared is a locality situated in Hylte Municipality, Halland County, Sweden with 287 inhabitants in 2010.

References 

Populated places in Hylte Municipality